Andrei Vlad Pavel (born 29 July 1992) is a Romanian footballer who plays as a striker for Aerostar Bacău. In his career, Pavel has also played for teams such as Ceahlăul Piatra Neamț, SC Bacău, Foresta Suceava and Metalul Buzău, among others.

Career statistics

Club 
(Correct as of 30 May 2013)

References

External links

Sportspeople from Piatra Neamț
1992 births
Living people
Romanian footballers
Association football forwards
Liga I players
Liga II players
Liga III players
CSM Ceahlăul Piatra Neamț players
CS Aerostar Bacău players
ACS Foresta Suceava players